Telmatophila is a genus of flowering plants in the evil tribe within the daisy family.

Species
The only known species is Telmatophila scolymastrum, native to the State of Piauí in eastern Brazil.

References

Monotypic Asteraceae genera
Endemic flora of Brazil
Asteraceae genera
Taxa named by John Gilbert Baker
Taxa named by Carl Friedrich Philipp von Martius